Cyclohexane is a cycloalkane with the molecular formula . Cyclohexane is non-polar. Cyclohexane is a colourless, flammable liquid with a distinctive detergent-like odor, reminiscent of cleaning products (in which it is sometimes used). Cyclohexane is mainly used for the industrial production of adipic acid and caprolactam, which are precursors to nylon.

Cyclohexyl is the alkyl substituent of cyclohexane and is abbreviated Cy.

Production

Modern
On an industrial scale, cyclohexane is produced by hydrogenation of benzene in the presence of a Raney nickel catalyst.  Producers of cyclohexane account for approximately 11.4% of global demand for benzene. The reaction is highly exothermic, with ΔH(500 K) = -216.37 kJ/mol. Dehydrogenation commenced noticeably above 300 °C, reflecting the favorable entropy for dehydrogenation.

Early
Unlike benzene, cyclohexane is not found in natural resources such as coal. For this reason, early investigators synthesized their cyclohexane samples.

Failure
 In 1867 Marcellin Berthelot reduced benzene with hydroiodic acid at elevated temperatures.
 In 1870, Adolf von Baeyer repeated the reaction and pronounced the same reaction product "hexahydrobenzene"
 in 1890 Vladimir Markovnikov believed he was able to distill the same compound from Caucasus petroleum, calling his concoction "hexanaphtene".

Surprisingly, their cyclohexanes boiled higher by 10 °C than either hexahydrobenzene or hexanaphthene, but this riddle was solved in 1895 by Markovnikov, N.M. Kishner, and Nikolay Zelinsky when they reassigned "hexahydrobenzene" and "hexanaphtene" as methylcyclopentane, the result of an unexpected rearrangement reaction.

Success
In 1894, Baeyer synthesized cyclohexane starting with a ketonization of pimelic acid followed by multiple reductions:

In the same year, E. Haworth and W.H. Perkin Jr. (1860–1929) prepared it via a Wurtz reaction of 1,6-dibromohexane.

Reactions and uses
Although rather unreactive, cyclohexane undergoes catalytic oxidation to produce cyclohexanone and cyclohexanol.  The cyclohexanone–cyclohexanol mixture, called "KA oil", is a raw material for adipic acid and caprolactam, precursors to nylon.  Several million kilograms of cyclohexanone and cyclohexanol are produced annually.

It is used as a solvent in some brands of correction fluid. Cyclohexane is sometimes used as a non-polar organic solvent, although n-hexane is more widely used for this purpose. It is frequently used as a recrystallization solvent, as many organic compounds exhibit good solubility in hot cyclohexane and poor solubility at low temperatures.

Cyclohexane is also used for calibration of differential scanning calorimetry (DSC) instruments, because of a convenient crystal-crystal transition at −87.1 °C.

Cyclohexane vapour is used in vacuum carburizing furnaces, in heat treating equipment manufacture.

Conformation

The 6-vertex edge ring does not conform to the shape of a perfect hexagon. The conformation of a flat 2D planar hexagon has considerable angle strain because its bonds are not 109.5 degrees; the torsional strain would also be considerable because all of the bonds would be eclipsed bonds. Therefore, to reduce torsional strain, cyclohexane adopts a three-dimensional structure known as the chair conformation, which rapidly interconvert at room temperature via a process known as a chair flip. During the chair flip, there are three other intermediate conformations that are encountered: the half-chair, which is the most unstable conformation, the more stable boat conformation, and the twist-boat, which is more stable than the boat but still much less stable than the chair. The chair and twist-boat are energy minima and are therefore conformers, while the half-chair and the boat are transition states and represent energy maxima.  The idea that the chair conformation is the most stable structure for cyclohexane was first proposed as early as 1890 by Hermann Sachse, but only gained widespread acceptance much later. The new conformation puts the carbons at an angle of 109.5°. Half of the hydrogens are in the plane of the ring (equatorial) while the other half are perpendicular to the plane (axial). This conformation allows for the most stable structure of cyclohexane. Another conformation of cyclohexane exists, known as boat conformation, but it interconverts to the slightly more stable chair formation. If cyclohexane is mono-substituted with a large substituent, then the substituent will most likely be found attached in an equatorial position, as this is the slightly more stable conformation.

Cyclohexane has the lowest angle and torsional strain of all the cycloalkanes; as a result cyclohexane has been deemed a 0 in total ring strain.

Solid phases
Cyclohexane has two crystalline phases. The high-temperature phase I, stable between 186 K and the melting point 280 K, is a plastic crystal, which means the molecules retain some rotational degree of freedom. The low-temperature (below 186 K) phase II is ordered. Two other low-temperature (metastable) phases III and IV have been obtained by application of moderate pressures above 30 MPa, where phase IV appears exclusively in deuterated cyclohexane (application of pressure increases the values of all transition temperatures).

Here Z is the number structure units per unit cell; the unit cell constants a, b and c were measured at the given temperature T and pressure P.

See also
 The Flixborough disaster, a major industrial accident caused by an explosion of cyclohexane.
 Hexane
Ring flip
 Cyclohexane (data page)

References

External links

International Chemical Safety Card 0242
 National Pollutant Inventory – Cyclohexane fact sheet
NIOSH Pocket Guide to Chemical Hazards
Cyclohexane@3Dchem
Hermann  Sachse and the first suggestion of a chair conformation.
NLM Hazardous Substances Databank – Cyclohexane
Methanol Discovered in Space
 Calculation of vapor pressure, liquid density, dynamic liquid viscosity,  surface tension of cyclohexane
Cyclohexane production process flowsheet, benzene hydrogenation technique

Cycloalkanes
Hydrocarbon solvents
Commodity chemicals
Six-membered rings
Cyclohexanes